The 2020 Deutsche Tourenwagen Masters was the thirty-fourth season of premier German touring car championship and also twenty-first season under the moniker of Deutsche Tourenwagen Masters since the series' resumption in 2000 as well as second and final season of "Class 1" regulations era.

Audi entered as the defending Manufacturers' Champion, after winning their seventh title in 2019, Audi Sport Team Rosberg entered as the defending teams' champion and René Rast entered as the defending drivers' champion, after winning his second title in 2019.

After Aston Martin and R-Motorsport decided to withdraw from Deutsche Tourenwagen Masters, the 2020 season marks the first season since 2011 that the series featured only two manufacturers.

2020 also marked the final season for Audi Sport in the DTM, shifting their focus to FIA Formula E and customer programmes. It also marked the final season for the "Class 1" regulations, as the DTM will switch to GT Pro regulations for 2021.

René Rast retains the DTM driver's title for the second year in a row (third overall).

Teams and drivers

The following manufacturers, teams and drivers competed in the 2020 Deutsche Tourenwagen Masters. All teams competed with tyres supplied by Hankook.

Team changes
BMW was due to introduce customer teams for the 2020 season, increasing their line-up size to seven cars. This led to the return of ART Grand Prix, which last competed in 2016.
Aston Martin terminated their contract with engine partner HWA after the 2019 season. Aston Martin ultimately withdrew from the series in January 2020.

Driver changes
2019 Audi Sport Team WRT drivers Jonathan Aberdein and Pietro Fittipaldi were dropped after one season with the team. They were replaced by another all-rookie lineup consisting of 2016 Indy Lights champion Ed Jones, who left the IndyCar Series after 3 seasons, and FIA Formula 3 Championship driver Fabio Scherer. Jones later pulled out of the championship due to complications in travel owing to the COVID-19 pandemic in the United Arab Emirates, paving the way for Harrison Newey to make his début instead. Aberdein moved across to BMW replacing Bruno Spengler, who left the series after fifteen years to join BMW Team RLL in the WeatherTech SportsCar Championship. Fittipaldi planned to return to the Super Formula Championship, but later joined Haas F1 Team as their test and reserve driver. All factory Audi DTM drivers returned for the third season running.
Former Mercedes driver Lucas Auer returned to the series with BMW after a one-year hiatus; he replaced Joel Eriksson, who left the series after two seasons to drive in the ADAC GT Masters.
Ferdinand von Habsburg moved to Audi Sport Team WRT after Aston Martin failed to return for 2020. His 2019 team-mates Daniel Juncadella, Paul di Resta and Jake Dennis were left without drives after the British marque's departure from the series.
Former Formula One driver Robert Kubica made his DTM debut with BMW ORLEN Team ART Grand Prix.

Mid-season changes
With Loïc Duval forced to miss the second Zolder round due to a clashing commitment at Petit Le Mans, Benoît Tréluyer deputised for him.

Calendar
A provisional ten-round calendar was announced on 19 September 2019: five rounds will be held in Germany, and four outside of Germany. However, the calendar was altered twice in response to the COVID-19 pandemic; initially on 26 March before a further modified schedule was published on 3 June.

Calendar changes
Original calendar
 The Misano World Circuit Marco Simoncelli was removed from the calendar, owing to declining attendance numbers. It will be replaced by the Autodromo Nazionale Monza which will make its series début. Also making its début on the calendar will be a Swedish round at Anderstorp Raceway.
The Hockenheimring will feature just one round instead of the usual two rounds, with Circuit Zolder becoming the new season-opener.
Russia will return to DTM for the first time since 2017, with the series inaugurating the Igora Drive circuit near Saint Petersburg.

First amendments
 The first half of the season was postponed, with the opening race scheduled for the Norisring on its original date in July. Two event slots were left in early August and October respectively for either the Russian or Swedish round, with original season opener Zolder moved to August. The rounds at Brands Hatch, TT Circuit Assen and the Nürburgring were left on their original dates, with events at the Lausitzring, Hockenheimring and Monza moved to October and November.

Second amendments
 The Norisring Trophy remained the opening round on a schedule restricted to Germany and Benelux. The first blank slot was filled with the series' first event at the Circuit de Spa-Francorchamps since 2005, and will be followed by two events on back-to-back weekends at the Lausitzring. Further double-header events will be held at the Nürburgring and Zolder, with the Lausitz and Nürburg events punctuated by a round at Assen. The Hockenheimring returned to the season finale slot having been shuffled out by Monza in the first amendment. The Nuremberg season-opener was eventually cancelled after the local council ruled against holding the event behind closed doors on economic and health grounds.

Regulation changes
On 1 July 2019 it was announced that Hankook would once again extend their DTM tyre partner contract until at least 2023, beating out bids by Continental, Dunlop, Michelin, Pirelli and Yokohama to provide tyres for the series.
A High Yaw Lift-Off (HYLO) system was introduced in front of the two rear wing pillars, to avoid cars becoming airborne in the event of a high-speed collision.

Results and standings

Season summary

Scoring system
Points were awarded to the top ten classified finishers as follows:

Additionally, the top three placed drivers in qualifying also received points:

Drivers' championship

† — Driver retired, but was classified as they completed 75% of the winner's race distance.

Teams' championship

Manufacturers' championship

References

External links
  

Deutsche Tourenwagen Masters seasons
Deutsche Tourenwagen Masters
Deutsche Tourenwagen Masters